Federico Gamboa Iglesias (22 December 1864 in Mexico City – 15 August 1939 in Mexico City) was a writer and diplomat from Mexico. He has been considered as one of the top representatives of Naturalism in México. Gamboa wrote novels, theater pieces, articles for newspapers and magazines and an autobiography when he was 28 years old. For many years he took notes of his travels, experiences and thoughts, which he later published as five diaries.  Posthumously another two volumes of his diaries were published.

Life as a Mexican diplomat 

Federico Gamboa was studying to become a notary in the National School of Law. However, both of his parents died and he was forced to drop out and start working in 1884. He began as an assistant in a Civil Court and also began on his journalist career. In El Diario del Hogar newspaper he had a regular article called Desde mi mesa (From my table), which he signed as «La Corcadiere». Even though he was doing well for himself, he was not satisfied and joined the public service.

After passing all the tests, he joined the Mexican Foreign Affairs Service as second secretary on 9 October 1888. Gamboa was 24 years old when he was sent to Guatemala; afterwards he worked for the Mexican Embassy in Argentina. From 12 August to 24 September 1913 he was the Secretary of Foreign Affairs but he ended his diplomatic career after only forty four days to run for President, along with general Eugenio Rascón as vicepresident, for the National Catholic Party on 26 October 1913.  He lost to Victoriano Huerta and Aureliano Blanquet.

Porfiriato 

Federico Gamboa is well known as one of the most representative Mexican novelist of Porfirio Díaz regime; José Emilio Pacheco pointed out that Gamboa was «a geographic anomaly that found its place in the Porfirian society». Gamboa was, primarily, a man that searched for a good life from that time as the end of his life. For the writer and diplomat, being part of Porfirio Díaz government was more than a chance event: it was for him an inevitable destiny. However, the reality of the Mexican Revolution changed his destiny. Porfirio Díaz left office in May 1911 and Gamboa received him in Europe and was able to keep his diplomatic post as ambassador in the Netherlands. During the Victoriano Huerta presidency he was invited to lead the Secretariat of Foreign Affairs; he led the Secretariat for forty-four days and then left to run for president, but lost against Huerta.  His return to México marked the end of Gamboa's good life as a public servant.  Furthermore, during Venustiano Carranza presidency, Gamboa had to leave Mexico along with his wife María Sagaseta and his only child, going first to the United States and then to La Habana, Cuba, from 1914 to 1919.

Works

Novels 

His novels are:

 Del natural. Esbozos contemporáneos. (1889)
 Apariencias
 Unauthorized version of Apariencias (1892) in El Oeste in Mercedes, Argentina
 Suprema Ley (1896)
 Unauthorized version of Suprema Ley (1913) in a Caracas, Venezuela newspaper.
 Metamorfosis (1899) 
 Santa (1903)
 Reconquista (1908)
 La llaga (1913)
 El evangelista: novel about Mexican customs (1922)

Autobiography and memoirs 

 Impresiones y recuerdos (1893)
 Mi Diario. Primera Serie I: 1892–1896, (1908)
 Mi Diario I (1892–1896) Mucho de mi vida y algo de la de otros Introducción de José Emilio Pacheco
 Mi Diario, Primera Serie II: 1897–1900, (1910)
 Mi Diario, Primera Serie III: 1901–1904, (1920)
 Mi Diario, Mucho de mi vida y algo de la de otros, Segunda Serie I: 1905–1908, (1934)
 Mi Diario IV (1905–1908) Mucho de mi vida y algo de la de otros
 Mi Diario, Mucho de mi vida y algo de la de otros, Segunda Serie II: 1909–1911(1938)
 Mi Diario VI (1912–1919) Mucho de mi vida y algo de la de otros (1995) Posthumous.
 MI Diario VII (1920–1939) Mucho de mi vida y algo de la de otros (1996) Posthumous.

Theater 

His theater pieces are :

 La última campaña (1894): social comedy in three acts and prose; opened in Teatro Principal of Mexico City on 11 May 1894.
 Divertirse (1894): Monologue in prose. Opened on 6 June 1894 in the National Theatre in Mexico City.
 La venganza de la Gleba (1904)
 A buena cuenta (1907)  Drama, San Salvador. Opened on 6 February 1914 in Teatro Ideal in Mexico City.
 Entre hermanos (1925), Tragedy; opened on 19 May 1928 in Teatro Arbeu, México.

Journalism 
 (1884) Proof reader of El Foro, a journal of Law.
 (1885–1887) Reporter, writer and chronicler for El Diario del Hogar. Finally, has his own space in 1886:Celajes de la ópera sign with the pseudonym «La Cocardière». A short while later, the column is called Desde mi mesa (From my table).
 (1888) writer for El Lunes. Starts to sign the articles under his name.
 (1894–1895) Federico Gamboa and Ángel de Campo published in El Mundo the article Siluetas que pasan, that they wrote under the pseudonyms of Bouvard or Pécuchet.
 (1915–1917) Interim director (1915), writer, in charge of translating into Spanish articles originally in English, French and Italian; in charge of the bibliographic section La Reforma Social magazine, in La Habana, Cuba.
 (1926–1939) wrote an article on a weekly basis for El Universal.

Essays 

 La novela mexicana (1914). This was a conference presented in the General Bookstore of Francisco Gamoneda on 3 January 1914. Printed the same year in México by México Eusebio Gómez de la Puente.
 La confesión de un palacio. Essay about Mexican national history.
 Un baile en Palacio, in collaboration with Gustavo Baz (1887)

Motion pictures based on his novels 

 Suprema Ley (1896): made into a movie in 1936 and opened on 19 March 1937 in the Rex Cinema. Directed by Rafael E. Portas, it starred Andrés Soler and Gloria Morel.
 Santa (1903) has been made into a movie four times in Mexico: in 1918, silent version directed by Luis G. Peredo with Elena Sánchez Valenzuela; in 1932, directed by Antonio Moreno, with a song from Agustín Lara and starring Lupita Tovar -this movie has been named within the best 100 films ever made in Mexico.  In 1943, another version, directed by Norman Foster and starring Esther Fernandez, opened on June 10 in cinema Palacio and its showings lasted four weeks.  Finally, in 1969 there Emilio Gómez Muriel directed the latest version.  
There is a version made in Spain in 1991, directed by Paul Leduc and called Latino Bar and a free adaptation made in 1949, directed by Fernando de Fuentes, starring Esther Fernández and called Hipólito el de Santa.
 La Llaga (1913)
 Entre Hermanos (1928): made into a movie in 1945 directed by Ramón Peón on a script written by Emilio Fernández, Mauricio Magdaleno and Carlos Velo. It starred Pedro Armendáriz, Carmen Montejo, Rafael Baledón and Anita Blanch.

Notes and references

References

Bibliography

Works from Gamboa

External links 
 

1864 births
1939 deaths
Mexican novelists
Mexican male writers
Male novelists
Mexican journalists
Male journalists
Mexican diplomats
Writers from Mexico City